Riesner is a surname. Notable people with the surname include:

 Dean Riesner (1918–2002), American film and television writer
 Hubert Riesner (born 1946), German long-distance runner
 Otto Riesner (1910–?), Polish footballer
 Rainer Riesner (born 1950), German pastor and theologian